The 1949 New Jersey gubernatorial election was held on November 8, 1949. Primary elections were held on April 19, 1949. Incumbent Republican Alfred E. Driscoll defeated Democratic former U.S. Representative Elmer H. Wene with 51.54% of the vote.

Under the 1947 New Jersey Constitution, Driscoll was the first Governor in state history eligible to succeed himself in a second consecutive term in a popular election. For the first time, the governor was elected to a four-year term, as opposed to three years. This is the most recent time the Republican Party won more than two consecutive gubernatorial elections in New Jersey.

Republican primary

Candidates
Alfred E. Driscoll, incumbent Governor
Robert L. Adams, Somerset County Freeholder

Campaign
Neither candidate led an aggressive campaign for the nomination. Driscoll reported no expenditures but accepted a few speaking engagements at key county party organization meetings in Monmouth, Essex, Union, and his native Camden County. Driscoll campaigned largely on his administration's liberal record and his support for universal health insurance, public housing, and civil rights.

Adams largely failed to raise his profile outside of Somerset and relied primarily on opposition to Driscoll within the party, as well as farmers disaffected by the Governor's suspension of retail milk price controls in January 1942. He accused Governor Driscoll of attempting to "out-deal the New Deal." His campaign spent $1,433 and his personal appearances were confined to rural north-central parts of the state.

Results

Adams's strength was primarily in rural areas, with an unexpectedly strong showing in Union County.

Democratic primary

Candidates
Elmer H. Wene, State Senator and former U.S. Representative from Cumberland County

Results

General election

Candidates
John C. Butterworth (Socialist Labor)
Alfred E. Driscoll (Republican)
James Imbrie (Progressive) 
Edson R. Leach (Prohibition)
Elmer H. Wene (Democratic)

Results

References

1949
New Jersey
Gubernatorial
New Jersey gubernatorial election